Moein Abbasian (born August 18, 1989) is an Iranian defender who currently plays for Iranian football club Havadar in the Persian Gulf Pro League.

Club career
Sadeghi joined Saba Qom in 2011 after spending the previous year at Sanati Kaveh.

References

1989 births
Living people
Shahr Khodro F.C. players
Havadar S.C. players
Association football forwards
Iranian footballers
21st-century Iranian people